Urmanayevo (Urmanay) is a rural locality (a selo) and the administrative center of Urmanayevsky Selsoviet, Bakalinsky District, Bashkortostan, Russia. The population was 256 as of 2010. There are 4 streets.

Geography 
Urmanayevo is located 39 km southwest of Bakaly (the district's administrative centre) by road. Suyundyukovo is the nearest rural locality.

References 

Rural localities in Bakalinsky District